The 2016 United States presidential election in Vermont was held on November 8, 2016, as part of the 2016 United States presidential election in which all 50 states plus the District of Columbia participated. Vermont voters chose three electors to represent them in the Electoral College via a popular vote pitting the Republican Party's nominee, businessman Donald Trump, and running mate Indiana Governor Mike Pence against Democratic Party nominee, former Secretary of State Hillary Clinton and her running mate, Virginia Senator Tim Kaine.  Independent Vermont Senator Bernie Sanders received unsolicited write-in votes.

Hillary Clinton won Vermont with 55.7% of the vote, a vote margin of 25.9% compared with the President Barack Obama's 35.6% vote margin in 2012. Donald Trump received 29.8% of the vote and won Essex County—the most rural and sparsely populated county in the state—thus making him the first Republican presidential candidate to win a county in Vermont since George W. Bush in 2004. 

After voting Republican in all but one election from 1856 to 1988, Vermont has become one of the most reliably Democratic strongholds in every presidential election since then. As a measure of how Republican Vermont once was, Trump became only the second Republican after George W. Bush to win the White House without carrying Vermont.  

Vermont Senator and Democratic primary candidate Bernie Sanders received 5.7% of the vote through write-ins, the highest write-in draft campaign percentage for a statewide presidential candidate in history. Libertarian nominee Gary Johnson, received 3.1%, and Green Party nominee Jill Stein received 2.1%.

Primary elections
On March 1, 2016, in the presidential primaries, Vermont voters expressed their preferences for the Democratic, Republican, and Libertarian parties. Voters who were unaffiliated chose any 1 primary in which to vote.

Democratic primary

The 2016 Vermont Democratic primary took place on March 1 as one of the Democratic Party's primaries ahead of the 2016 presidential election.

On the same day, dubbed "Super Tuesday," Democratic primaries were held in 10 other states plus American Samoa, while the Republican Party held primaries in 11 states including their own Vermont primary.

As Sanders was an extremely popular favorite son, there was no campaign to speak of and all pledged delegates were given to Sanders, due to Clinton getting less than 15% of the popular vote. Sanders won every municipality in the state.

Republican primary

General election

Predictions

Polling

Hillary Clinton won every poll pre-election by double digits. Interestingly, she only reached 50% in the last poll, leading 50% to 22%, which may indicate support for writing in Bernie Sanders or other third party candidates. The average of the final three polls showed Hillary Clinton leading Trump 48% to 22%.

Results

! Other Write-ins
! Candidate
! Votes
! Percentage

Results by county

Counties that flipped from Democratic to Republican 

 Essex (largest town: Lunenburg)

By congressional district
Due to the state's low population, only one congressional district is allocated. This district, called the At-Large district because it covers the entire state, is thus equivalent to the statewide election results.

See also
 United States presidential elections in Vermont
 2016 Democratic Party presidential debates and forums
 2016 Democratic Party presidential primaries
 2016 Republican Party presidential debates and forums
 2016 Republican Party presidential primaries

References

External links
 RNC 2016 Republican Nominating Process 
 Green papers for 2016 primaries, caucuses, and conventions
 Decision Desk Headquarter Results for Vermont

Vermont
2016
Presidential